The Cuban Liberty Council (CLC) is a not-for-profit organization whose stated goal is to promote liberty and democracy in Cuba.

Activities
CLC was founded October 10, 2001. Many of the members of the CLC's Board of Directors and Executive Committee have played key roles in shaping US policy towards Cuba and have led diplomatic delegations to the UN Human Rights Commission, where they achieved the passage of key UN Resolutions condemning Fidel Castro's human rights record. They have also played a role in advising foreign governments on their Cuba policy and have met with numerous world leaders, including: Václav Havel, Lech Wałęsa, Ronald Reagan, Boris Yeltsin, George H. W. Bush, George W. Bush, José María Aznar, Ernesto Zedillo and Felipe González.

It has been called a 'hardline' organization.

Notable members 
 Marcell Felipe
 Feliciano Foyo
 Horacio Garcia
 Alberto Hernandez
 Ninoska Pérez Castellón
 Diego R. Suarez
 Luis Zuniga

See also 

 Cuba-United States relations
 Diaspora politics in the United States
 Ethnic interest groups in the United States
 Lobbying in the United States
 Cuban-American lobby

References

Opposition to Fidel Castro
Cuba–United States relations
2001 establishments in the United States
Anti-communist organizations in the United States